"I Close My Eyes" is a 2002 pop ballad by German singer Sandra. It was released on 11 November 2002 by Virgin Records as the third and final single from her seventh studio album The Wheel of Time. The song was written by Andy Jonas (also known as Angel Hard) who has performed male vocals on her fifth and sixth studio albums, and produced by Michael Cretu and Jens Gad. The song performed poorly on the charts and peaked only at number ninety-three in Germany.

Track listing
 CD maxi single
"I Close My Eyes" — 4:08
"Forgive Me" (Chill Out Radio Edit) — 4:18
"The Wheel of Time" — 4:09
"Forever" (Video) — 3:44

Charts

References

External links
 "I Close My Eyes" at Discogs
 The official Sandra channel at YouTube

2002 singles
2002 songs
Sandra (singer) songs
Song recordings produced by Jens Gad
Song recordings produced by Michael Cretu
Virgin Records singles